Anthony Natale is a deaf Canadian-born American actor who has performed in many movies and television shows such as Jerry Maguire and Mr. Holland's Opus. He portrays Cameron Bledsoe on Switched at Birth and Captain Thom in Nancy Drew.

Personal life
He teaches American Sign Language and enjoys fixing up houses in his spare time.

Filmography

References

External links
 Anthony Natale Official Website
 

American male deaf actors
American male television actors
American male film actors
Living people
Place of birth missing (living people)
1967 births
20th-century American male actors